Akçaşehir is a belde (town) in the central district (Karaman) of Karaman Province, Turkey.
The population is of Akçaşehir is 2409. as of 2010 . Akçaşehir is an old settlement. According to mayor's page the foundation date of the town may be 5000 years ago (Bronze Age). During the early Middle Ages it was a part of the Byzantine Empire. However, there are only a few remains from the deep history. Various Turkmen  tribes as well as a Pechenek tribe settled in Akçaşehir in the late 11th and 12th centuries. It was a part of Seljuks in the 13th century, a part of Karamanids in the 14th and early 15th centuries and later a part of Ottoman Empire. The town is situated in a vast plain. Traditional crops are cereals. But lately apple production is on the rise.

Future

According to Sustainable development report prepared by the Ministry of Environment and Forestry (Turkey) the projected population of Akçaşehir in 2025 is 6000. The present master plan  of the town is found to be sufficient for the future expansion.

References

Populated places in Karaman Province
Towns in Turkey
Karaman Central District
Lycaonia